Carl Rümpler was a 19th-century German publisher, based in Hanover. He and his publishing company of the same name published a high number of works in the 1850s–1870s. He published many books related to myths and tales such as Gervase of Tilbury's medieval encyclopedia Otia Imperialia in 1856, he also published works such as Herman Grimm's Leben Michelangelo in 2 volumes between 1860–63 amongst many others.

References

German publishers (people)
19th-century German businesspeople
Businesspeople from Hanover